The Very Best of Chris de Burgh is the second compilation album by Chris de Burgh, released by Telstar Records in 1984.

Track listing
All songs written by Chris de Burgh.

Side One

"Don't Pay the Ferryman"
"The Ecstasy of Flight"
"The Traveller"
"Ship to Shore"
"Flying Home"
"Satin Green Shutters" – alternately "Spanish Train"
"A Spaceman Came Travelling"

Side Two

"Spanish Train" – alternately "The Lady in Red"
"High on Emotion"
"Borderline"
"Lonely Sky"
"In a Country Churchyard"
"Patricia the Stripper"
"Waiting for the Hurricane"

Charts

External links
 

Chris de Burgh albums
1984 greatest hits albums
Telstar Records compilation albums